Vilisovo is a rural locality (a village) in Asovskoye Rural Settlement, Beryozovsky District, Perm Krai, Russia. The population was 38 as of 2010.

Geography 
Vilisovo is located on the Barda River, 29 km southeast of  Beryozovka (the district's administrative centre) by road. Pronosnoye is the nearest rural locality.

References 

Rural localities in Beryozovsky District, Perm Krai